Tuhaglia (Tuhelj, Tuchegl) is a medieval fortress in the area of the parish of . At the end of the 19th century, the fortress was called Tuheljgrad. 

The remains of the fort are on a steep hill above the Bijela (White) River, three kilometers north of Tarčin. Otherwise, the entire canyon of the Bijela River, from Tarčin to it confluence with the Crna (Black) River and formation of Lepenica River, is called Tuhelja.

History 
The Tuhelj Fortress gravitated to the area around today's Tarčin. Hence, it is assumed that the settlement of Smucka near Tarčin was actually a suburb of Tuhelj. It is mentioned in 1428 as "Smuçicha". The necropolis of stećak tombstones at the Borak site also speaks of a medieval settlement near Tarčin.

References 

Castles in Bosnia and Herzegovina
14th century in Bosnia